de Candole may refer to:

 Henry de Candole (priest) - The Very Rev Henry Lawe Corry Vully de Candole DD, MA (1868–1933) Dean of Bristol.
 Armar Corry Vully de Candole - (1869-1941), Clerk in Holy Orders, brother of Henry de Candole (priest).
 James Alexander Corry Vully de Candole - (1871-1917), Clerk in Holy Orders, brother of Henry de Candole (priest).
 Henry de Candole - Henry Handley Vully de Candole (1895-1971),  Bishop of Knaresborough, son of Henry de Candole (priest).
 Alec de Candole - Alexander Corry Vully de Candole (1897–1918), WW 1 poet, son of Henry de Candole (priest).
 Eric Armar Vully de Candole - (1901-1981), son of Armar Corry Vully de Candole.
 Charles Patrick de Candole - (1907-1997), Clerk in Holy Orders, son of James Alexander Corry Vully de Candole
 Donald Vully de Candole - (1912-1982), Clerk in Holy Orders, son of James Alexander Corry Vully de Candole
 John Armar Vully de Candole, M.C. - (1933-), soldier, son of Eric Armar Vully de Candole
 Mark Andrew Vully de Candole - (1953-), son of Eric Armar Vully de Candole